Yapalaparvi also spelled as Yapalparvi is a village in the Sindhanur taluk of Raichur district in the Indian state of Karnataka. Yapalaparvi is located near to Pothnal stream joining Tungabhadra river. Yapalaparvi lies on road connecting Pothnal-Ayanur.

Demographics
As of 2001 India census, Yapalaparvi had a population of 1,159 with 583 males and 576 females and 194 Households.

See also
Ragalaparvi
Valkamdinni
Puldinni
Olaballari
Sindhanur
Raichur

References

External links
 raichur.nic.in

Villages in Raichur district